Rhos Blaen Carrog is a Site of Special Scientific Interest in Ceredigion,  west Wales, due to its population of Wavy St. John's Wort (Hypericum undulatum), an extremely rare variety of St. John's Wort.

References

See also
List of Sites of Special Scientific Interest in Ceredigion

Sites of Special Scientific Interest in Ceredigion